Air Leisure was an Egyptian charter airline headquartered in Cairo and based in Cairo International Airport. It connected several Asian cities, mainly in China, with Egyptian leisure destinations.

History
In 2013, Air Memphis, an Egyptian charter airline was acquired and began new operations under the name of Air Leisure, operating charter flights to destinations in North and Northeast Africa, the Middle East and Europe using an MD-83 transferred from Air Memphis.

In December 2014, the airline acquired the first of three Airbus A340-200 aircraft, which had previously been operated by Egyptair. This led to the airline being the only operator of the A340-200 in the world until 2017 when the airline phased the aircraft out in favour of the younger, more fuel efficient Airbus A330-200.

In February 2016, it was announced that the airline had signed a letter of intent with Sukhoi Civil Aircraft for the purchase of four Sukhoi Superjet 100 aircraft with an option for six more. In December 2016, it was announced that the airline had acquired 3 used A330s previously operated by Emirates. These aircraft are used to replace the fleet of A340s. The first aircraft arrived in Cairo on 27 December 2016.

On 22 October 2018, it has been announced that Air Leisure suspended its operations.

Destinations
As of January 2018, Air Leisure served the following destinations:

China
Beijing - Beijing Capital International Airport 
Shanghai - Shanghai Pudong International Airport 
Xi'an - Xi'an Xianyang International Airport

Egypt
Aswan - Aswan International Airport
Cairo - Cairo International Airport

Fleet

Current Fleet

, the Air Leisure fleet consisted of the following aircraft:

Former fleet
The airline previously operated the following aircraft:
 Airbus A340-200
 McDonnell Douglas MD-83

References

External links

Defunct airlines of Egypt
Airlines established in 2014
Airlines disestablished in 2018
Companies based in Cairo
Egyptian companies established in 2014